Danijel Klarić (born 19 January 1995) is an Austrian footballer currently playing as a forward.

Club career
Klarić spent most of his career with Austrian clubs in the four top levels of domestic football.

References

External links
 
 

1995 births
Living people
Footballers from Vienna
Austrian people of Croatian descent
Association football forwards
Croatian footballers
Austrian footballers
Wisła Kraków players
SK Sturm Graz players
SC Wiener Neustadt players
S.S. Fidelis Andria 1928 players
S.S. Akragas Città dei Templi players
SV Wienerberger players
Austrian Regionalliga players
Ekstraklasa players
Austrian Football Bundesliga players
2. Liga (Austria) players
Serie C players
Austrian Landesliga players
Austrian expatriate footballers
Expatriate footballers in Poland
Austrian expatriate sportspeople in Poland
Expatriate footballers in Italy
Austrian expatriate sportspeople in Italy